Wolf Island National Wildlife Refuge, located approximately  off the coast of Darien, Georgia, in McIntosh County, was established on April 3, 1930 to provide protection and habitat for migratory birds. The barrier island refuge consists of Wolf Island and two smaller islands, Egg and Little Egg. Over 75% of the refuge's  are composed of saltwater marsh.

Wolf Island NWR was designated a National Wilderness Area in 1975 and is maintained as such, with its primary purpose being to provide protection for migratory birds and such endangered and threatened species as the loggerhead sea turtle and piping plover. Due to its status as a wilderness area, no public use facilities are planned on the refuge. The refuge's salt waters are open to a variety of recreational activities such as fishing and crabbing, but all beach, marsh, and upland areas are closed to the public.

References

Refuge website

National Wildlife Refuges in Georgia (U.S. state)
Protected areas of McIntosh County, Georgia
Protected areas established in 1930
Wetlands of Georgia (U.S. state)
Landforms of McIntosh County, Georgia
Islands of McIntosh County, Georgia
Islands of Georgia (U.S. state)
1930 establishments in Georgia (U.S. state)
Barrier islands of Georgia (U.S. state)